The Allardyce Range is a mountain range rising south of Cumberland Bay and dominating the central part of South Georgia, a UK overseas territory. Other peaks of the range include Mount Roots.

Although not shown on the charts of South Georgia by Cook in 1775 or Bellingshausen in 1819, peaks of this range were doubtless seen by those explorers. The range was named c. 1915 after Sir William Lamond Allardyce (1861–1930), Governor of the Falkland Islands and Dependencies, 1904–14.

See also
Nachtigal Peak
Sutton Crag

References 
 Stonehouse, B (ed.) Encyclopedia of Antarctica and the Southern Oceans (2002)

Mountains and hills of South Georgia